Kenduskeag Stream is a  stream in the U.S. state of Maine. It is a tributary of the Penobscot River. The stream rises at the outlet of Garland Pond in the town of Garland, and flows southeast through Corinth, Kenduskeag, and Glenburn, before it reaches the city of Bangor. Kenduskeag means "eel weir place" in Penobscot.

Notable
Kenduskeag Stream plays an important role in the fictional town of Derry, Maine, in the works of Stephen King.

In 1984, Charlie Howard, victim of a hate-crime, was harassed and assaulted by homophobic teenagers who then threw him over the State Bridge into the Kenduskeag Stream, and Howard died by drowning.

In 2018, Peter Manuel of Bangor also died by drowning in the stream.

External links
 Kenduskeag Stream Canoe Race

References

Rivers of Maine
Rivers of Penobscot County, Maine